Carolyn Keene is the pseudonym of the authors of the Nancy Drew mystery stories and The Dana Girls mystery stories, both produced by the Stratemeyer Syndicate. In addition, the Keene pen name is credited with the Nancy Drew spin-off, ''River Heights, and the Nancy Drew Notebooks.

Edward Stratemeyer, the founder of the Syndicate, hired writers, beginning with Mildred Wirt, later Mildred Wirt Benson, to write the manuscripts for the Nancy Drew books. The writers were paid $125 for each book and were required by their contract to give up all rights to the work and to maintain confidentiality.

Benson is credited as the primary writer of Nancy Drew books under the pseudonym Carolyn Keene. Harriet Adams (Stratemeyer's daughter) rewrote the original books and added new titles after the withdrawal of Benson.

Other ghostwriters who used this name to write Nancy Drew mysteries included Leslie McFarlane, James Duncan Lawrence, Walter Karig, Nancy Axelrad, Patricia Doll, Charles S. Strong, Alma Sasse, Wilhelmina Rankin, George Waller Jr., Margaret Fischer, and Susan Wittig Albert. Also involved in the Nancy Drew writing process were Harriet Stratemeyer Adams's daughters, who gave input on the series and sometimes helped to choose book titles; the Syndicate's secretary, Harriet Otis Smith, who invented the characters of Nancy's friends Bess and George; and the editors at Grosset & Dunlap.

In 1979, the Stratemeyer Syndicate changed publishers to Simon & Schuster, a move that the former publishers, Grosset & Dunlap, went to court to prevent, claiming a breach of contract. The decision was made in favor of the Syndicate, stating that they could choose which publisher they would like to use for subsequent entries in the series.

In 1985, the Syndicate was bought by publishers Simon & Schuster; the Drew books are now handled by Mega-Books, a New York book packager.

Ghostwriters

Nancy Drew

See also

 Franklin W. Dixon
 Nancy Drew Mystery Stories

References

External links

 
 

American mystery writers
Stratemeyer Syndicate pseudonyms
Nancy Drew
20th-century American novelists
American women novelists
Women mystery writers